The 1909 South Carolina United States Senate election was held on January 26, 1909. Its outcome was determined by a Democratic Party primary election held on August 25 and September 8, 1908. Interim Senator Frank B. Gary, who had been elected to complete the unfinished term of the late Senator Asbury Latimer, did not run for re-election. Democrat Ellison D. Smith won the Democratic primary and was elected by the General Assembly for a six-year term.

Background
Prior to the ratification of the Seventeenth Amendment to the United States Constitution, U.S. senators were elected by state legislatures rather than the direct election by the people of the state. However, the South Carolina Democratic Party organized non-binding primary elections for the U.S. Senate beginning in 1896, and the South Carolina General Assembly confirmed the choice of the Democratic voters.

Democratic primary

Candidates
John Gary Evans, former Governor of South Carolina (1894–97)
John P. Grace, candidate for State Senate in 1902 and Charleston County Sheriff in 1904
George Johnstone, former U.S. Representative from Newberry County (1891–93)
William W. Lumpkin
O.B. Martin
R. Goodwin Rhett
Ellison D. Smith, former State Representative and leading advocate for the cotton industry

Campaign
Ellison D. Smith, an official in the Cotton Association and often called "Cotton Ed", entered the Democratic primary but found himself in early trouble when he promised that cotton would rise to eighteen cents and it did not occur. However, his rhetorical skills allowed him to take command of the stump and attract voters to his campaign. 

Former Governor John Gary Evans was making his fourth straight attempt for the Senate seat and received the private support of Senator Ben Tillman. The tide of Tillmanism had receded in the state and the public endorsement by Tillman would doom a candidate's prospects. Smith and Evans emerged as the top two candidates were to face each other in a runoff election on September 8. Evans once again failed to carry the day and Smith scored a resounding victory.

Results

Runoff

Election
Smith was elected unanimously by the South Carolina Legislature on January 26, 1909.

See also
List of United States senators from South Carolina
1908–09 United States Senate elections
1908 United States House of Representatives elections in South Carolina
1908 South Carolina gubernatorial election

Notes

References

 

South Carolina
1909
United States Senate
Single-candidate elections